The 2019 Club Deportivo Universidad Católica season is the 79th season and the club's 45st consecutive season in the top flight of Chilean football. In addition to the domestic league, Universidad Católica are participating in this season's editions of the Copa Chile, the Supercopa de Chile, the Copa Libertadores and the Copa Sudamericana

Squad

Transfers

In

Out

Loans in

Loans out

New contracts

Competitions

Overview

Primera Division

League table

Results summary

Results by round

Matches

Copa Chile

Second round

Knockout phase

Round of 16

Quarterfinals

Semifinals
With the ANFP's Council of Presidents voting to conclude the 2019 season on 29 November 2019, it was decided that both the semifinals and final would be single-legged series to be played in January 2020.

Supercopa de Chile

Copa Libertadores

Group stage

The group stage draw was held on 17 December 2018, 20:30 PYST (UTC−3), at the CONMEBOL Convention Centre in Luque, Paraguay.

Copa Sudamericana

Second stage

Statistics

Squad statistics

† Player left Universidad Católica during the season

Goals

Last updated: December 2019
Source: Soccerway

Assists

Last updated: December 2019
Source: Soccerway

Clean sheets

*Last updated: December 2019
Source: Soccerway

Notes

References

External links

2019